Gallini is an Italian surname. Notable people with the surname include:

Giovanni Gallini (1728–1805), Italian dancer
Mo Gallini (born 1966), American actor
Nancy Gallini, American economist and author
Pina Gallini (1888–1974), Italian film actress

Italian-language surnames